Faith Winter (born May 7, 1980) is a Democratic Party legislator in the U.S. State of Colorado. She represents District 25 in the Colorado State Senate. Her district covers portions of Adams County, the City and County of Broomfield and Weld County, including the communities of Broomfield, Westminster, Northglenn and 
Shaw Heights. Prior to 2013, she represented District 24. During the 2020 reapportionment process, her residence moved from senate district 24 to senate district 25.

Winter was first elected to the state senate in 2018. Earlier, Winter served in the Colorado House of Representatives from 2014 to 2019, representing Colorado House District 35.

She attended the University of the Redlands in Redlands, California, where she majored in Environmental Management and minored in Biology. Prior to becoming a Colorado Legislator, Winter had the experience of being the National Program Director for EnviroCitizen, National Field Director for The White House Project, Executive Director for Emerge Colorado, and Program Director for Colorado Conservation Voters.

2016 reelection campaign 
Winter ran successfully for reelection in 2016 as a Democrat.

2016 legislative session 
Winter served on the Appropriations Committee, the Business, Labor, Economic, and Workforce Development Committee, and the Transportation and Energy Committee. She sponsored bipartisan bill HB16-1438, which makes it an unfair employment practice if an employer fails to provide reasonable accommodations for an applicant for employment or an employee for conditions related to pregnancy or childbirth.

2015 legislative session 
In 2015, Winter sponsored multiple bipartisan bills, including HB15-1275 which builds programs in high schools that allow students to get real-world experience in apprenticeships, and HB15-1323, which works to reduce testing burden on students and teachers by nearly 40 hours.

External links
Legislative website
Campaign website

References

1980 births
Living people
Democratic Party members of the Colorado House of Representatives
21st-century American politicians
Winter
21st-century American women politicians
Democratic Party Colorado state senators